Parliamentary elections were held in Kiribati on 8 May 1991, with a second round on 16 May. All candidates for the 39 seats ran as independents, with more than 15 of the incumbent MPs losing their seats. Voter turnout was 65.9%.

Results

References

Kiribati
1991 in Kiribati
Elections in Kiribati
Non-partisan elections
Election and referendum articles with incomplete results